Of Two Minds is a television movie following a family that struggles to care for a loved one suffering from schizophrenia. The story revolves around two sisters and their challenging relationship as they are faced with troubling situations and difficult situations many people deal with when caring for schizophrenic family members.

The film stars Emmy-nominated actress Kristin Davis as Billie, Emmy Award winning actress Tammy Blanchard as Elizabeth ('Baby'), and Oscar winner Louise Fletcher. Of Two Minds is a Lifetime original movie that was written by Oscar nominated Richard Friedenberg and released on March 10, 2012.

Plot
Of Two Minds follows the challenging relationship between two sisters, Billie Clark (Kristen Davis) and Elizabeth 'Baby' Clark (Tammy Blanchard). Baby suffers from schizophrenia and lives with their mother who helps care for her while Billie settles down happily with her family. When their mother has a sudden stroke, Billie takes on the responsibility of caring for her younger sister and moves into their childhood home along with her husband (Joel Gretsch) and two children (Mackenzie Aladjem and Alex le Bas). Baby's swiftly changing moods and uncontrollable episodes bring high levels of stress to the family while they try to adjust to the new living arrangements until a disturbing incident occurs between Billie's son and Baby. Afterwards, it is clear to Billie that she is not in a position to handle Baby's illness and is faced with a difficult decision on how to properly care for her sister while she considers what is best for Baby and for her family.

Cast
 Kristin Davis as Billie Clark
 Tammy Blanchard as Elizabeth ‘Baby’ Clark
 Joel Gretsch as Rick Clark
 Bonnie Bartlett as Kathleen
 Mackenzie Aladjem as Mollie Clark
 Alex le Bas as Davis Clark
 Jessica Lundy as Madeleine
 Anthony Azizi as Dr. Lewis
 Louise Fletcher as Aunt Will

Reception
The film was generally well received upon its television debut. Huffington Post critic Jackie K. Cooper reported that it was an "engrossing movie and is led by a pitch perfect performance by Tammy Blanchard." Cooper concluded his review with saying: "It is an outstanding presentation which tackles a serious subject." Michael Starr of the New York Post reviewed the film and said that "Of Two Minds doesn't pander to its audience, and tries earnestly to give us a sense of what it is like to deal with a very real affliction." The film was later honored at the 17th Annual Prism Showcase with an award for Best TV Movie or Mini-Series for the film's authentic portrayal of health issues.

References

2012 television films
2012 films
Lifetime (TV network) films
Films about schizophrenia
Films directed by Jim O'Hanlon